SM9 may refer to:

SM9 (classification), a swimming disability category
SM9 (cryptography standard), a Chinese national cryptography standard
SM-9, a machine gun